John E. Rooney (born April 23, 1939) is an American Republican Party politician, who served in the New Jersey General Assembly, where he represented the 39th Legislative District. He served in the Assembly from 1983 to 2010, which made him the longest-serving representative in the General Assembly. He retired from the Assembly after his term expired in January 2010 and endorsed Republican Washington Township Councilman Bob Schroeder in the 2009 election who won his seat. John Rooney served as a Council member in Northvale from 1976 to 1979. In 1979 he was elected Mayor of Northvale and served until 1988. He held dual office as Mayor of Northvale and State Assemblyman during this period. After the residents of Northvale asked him to run again in 1992 he won that election and served again as Mayor of Northvale and State Assemblyman. Altogether John Rooney served the residents of Northvale and Legislative District 39 from 1976 until 2012.

Biography
Rooney served in the Assembly on the Environment and Solid Waste Committee and the Telecommunications and Utilities Committee. He had served on the Regulatory Oversight Committees and on the Intergovernmental Relations Commission.

Rooney served as Mayor of Northvale, New Jersey from 1991 until his re-election defeat in 2006, when he was defeated by Democrat John Hogan. He also served as mayor from 1979–1986 and was a member of the Borough Council from 1976–1978. He was a Commissioner serving on the Bergen County Utility Authority from 1983–1988.

Rooney graduated with an A.A.S. from Syracuse University (Language), received training at the Air Force Institute (Russian) and graduated with a B.S. degree from Rutgers University (Management). He served in the United States Air Force from 1961–1965 as an Airman First Class. Rooney's works as an Independent Consultant.

District 39
Each of the forty districts in the New Jersey Legislature has one representative in the New Jersey Senate and two members in the New Jersey General Assembly. The other representatives from the 39th District for the 2008-2009 Legislative Session are:
Senator Gerald Cardinale, and
Assemblywoman Charlotte Vandervalk

References

External links
Assemblyman Rooney's legislative Web page, New Jersey Legislature
New Jersey Legislature financial disclosure forms
2007 2006 2005 2004

1939 births
Living people
Mayors of places in New Jersey
Republican Party members of the New Jersey General Assembly
People from Northvale, New Jersey
Politicians from Bergen County, New Jersey
Rutgers University alumni
Syracuse University alumni
United States Air Force airmen
21st-century American politicians